"Knockin' on Heaven's Door" is a song by American singer-songwriter Bob Dylan, written for the soundtrack of the 1973 film Pat Garrett and Billy the Kid. Released as a single two months after the film's premiere, it became a worldwide hit, reaching the Top 10 in several countries. The song became one of Dylan's most popular and most covered post-1960s compositions, spawning covers from Eric Clapton, Guns N' Roses, Randy Crawford and more. 

Described by Dylan biographer Clinton Heylin as "an exercise in splendid simplicity", the song features two short verses, the lyrics of which comment directly on the scene in the film for which it was written: the death of a frontier lawman (Slim Pickens) who refers to his wife (Katy Jurado) as "Mama".

It was ranked number 190 in 2004 by Rolling Stone magazine, in their 500 Greatest Songs of All Time, and number 192 in 2010.

Musicians
Bob Dylan: vocals, guitar
Roger McGuinn: guitar
Jim Keltner: drums
Terry Paul: bass
Carl Fortina: harmonium
Carol Hunter: backing vocals
Donna Weiss: backing vocals
Brenda Patterson: backing vocals

Charts

Weekly charts

Year-end charts

Certifications

Other Bob Dylan versions
According to his website, Dylan has performed the song in concert 460 times between its live debut in 1974 and its last outing in 2003. Some of these versions have appeared on Dylan's live and Bootleg Series albums including:
 Before the Flood
 Bob Dylan at Budokan
 Dylan & the Dead
 The 30th Anniversary Concert Celebration
 MTV Unplugged
 Thirty-Nine Years of Great Concert Performances
 The Rolling Thunder Revue

Eric Clapton and Arthur Louis versions
In January 1975 Eric Clapton played on Arthur Louis's recording of "Knockin' on Heaven's Door" which was arranged in a cross-over reggae style. After the recording sessions with Louis, Clapton recorded his own version of the song which was released as a single in August 1975 two weeks after Louis's version.  Clapton's version made it to No. 38 on the UK charts, but the single was less successful in the U.S where it failed to chart on the Billboard Hot 100 (although it reached on No. 109 on Cash Box's Looking Ahead chart). Clapton's 1996 boxed set Crossroads 2: Live in the Seventies features a performance of the song recorded in London in April 1977. There were also performances of the song included on the Journeyman (1990) and the One More Car, One More Rider (2003) world tours. Several Clapton compilation albums also feature the song.

Guns N' Roses versions

In 1987, American hard rock band Guns N' Roses started performing the song. A live version of the song was released on the 12-inch single of "Welcome to the Jungle" the same year. They recorded and released a studio version in 1990 for the soundtrack of the film Days of Thunder that reached No. 18 on the US Billboard Album Rock Tracks chart and No. 56 on Canada's RPM Top Singles chart.

This studio recording was slightly modified for the band's 1991 album Use Your Illusion II, discarding the responses in the second verse. Released as the second single from the album, it reached No. 2 on the UK Singles Chart and the New Zealand Singles Chart. Elsewhere, the single topped the charts of Portugal, Belgium, and the Netherlands; it was the best-selling song of 1992 in the latter country. In Ireland, where the song also reached No. 1, it became Guns N' Roses' third (and to date last) number-one single as well as their ninth consecutive top-five hit.

Their performance of the song at the Freddie Mercury Tribute Concert in 1992 was used as the B-side for the single release and was also included on their Live Era: '87–'93 album, released in 1999. Another version was released on the video Use Your Illusion World Tour - 1992 in Tokyo II. The music video for this version of the song was directed by Andy Morahan.

Personnel
Guns N' Roses
 W. Axl Rose – lead vocals
 Slash – lead guitar
 Izzy Stradlin – rhythm guitar
 Duff McKagan – bass
 Matt Sorum – drums 
 Dizzy Reed – piano

Guest musicians
 The Waters – backing vocals

Charts

Weekly charts

Year-end charts

Decade-end charts

Certifications

Dunblane tribute

In 1996 and with the consent of Dylan, Scottish musician Ted Christopher wrote a new verse for "Knockin' on Heaven's Door" in memory of the schoolchildren and teacher killed in the Dunblane school massacre. This has been, according to some sources, one of the few times Dylan has officially authorized anybody to add or change the lyrics to one of his songs.

This version of the song, featuring children from the village singing the chorus with the guitarist and producer of Dylan's album Infidels (1983), Mark Knopfler, was released on December 9, 1996, in the United Kingdom and reached No. 1 on the UK and Scottish Singles Charts, as well as No. 6 in Iceland and Ireland. The proceeds went to charities for children.
The song was featured on the compilation album Hits 97, where all royalties from the song were given to three charities.

Charts

Weekly charts

Year-end charts

Certifications

Sampled version
Gabrielle's single "Rise" (2000) sampled from this song. Dylan liked "Rise" so much that he allowed Gabrielle to use the sample for free, while receiving a co-writer credit for providing the song's chord progression and vocal sample.

Soundtrack inclusions

References

1973 songs
1973 singles
1970s ballads
1992 singles
1996 singles
Avril Lavigne songs
Bertelsmann Music Group singles
Bob Dylan songs
Columbia Records singles
Dutch Top 40 number-one singles
Eric Clapton songs
European Hot 100 Singles number-one singles
Film theme songs
Geffen Records singles
Grateful Dead songs
Guns N' Roses songs
Irish Singles Chart number-one singles
Music videos directed by Andy Morahan
Number-one singles in Portugal
Number-one singles in Scotland
RCA Records singles
Rock ballads
Roger Waters songs
Songs about death
Songs written by Bob Dylan
Songs written for films
UK Singles Chart number-one singles
Ultratop 50 Singles (Flanders) number-one singles
Warren Zevon songs